The İznik shemaya (Alburnus nicaeensis) was a species of freshwater cyprinid fish that was endemic to Lake İznik in Turkey. It has not been found since the late 20th century, and is now presumed extinct by the IUCN. It is most likely that this species became extinct with the introduction of the big-scale sand smelt to Lake İznik.

References

Alburnus
Fish described in 1941
Fish extinctions since 1500
Endemic fauna of Turkey